François Morel (born 10 June 1959) is a French actor and filmmaker. He is best known for appearing in sketch television series Les Deschiens (1993-2002).

Filmography

References

External links 

1959 births
French male film actors
Living people
French male screenwriters
French screenwriters
20th-century French male actors
21st-century French male actors
French film directors
People from Orne
Officiers of the Ordre des Arts et des Lettres